Appleton Lower Common is a  biological Site of Special Scientific Interest west of Appleton in Oxfordshire.

The common has diverse broadleaved woodland on Oxford Clay with rides and glades. The shrub layer has a rich variety of species, such as primrose, goldilocks buttercup, early purple orchid, twayblade and wood anemone. Invertebrates include the rare club-tailed dragonfly.

The site is private land but it is crossed by two public footpaths.

References

 
Sites of Special Scientific Interest in Oxfordshire